Spring Song is a 1954 German-Italian drama film directed by Hans Albin, and starring Anne-Marie Blanc, René Deltgen, and Albert Lieven.

The film's sets were designed by the art directors Ernst H. Albrecht and Paul Markwitz. It was partly shot on location in Switzerland.

Cast
 Oliver Grimm as Wolfgang Fabricius
 Elsbeth Sigmund as Vreni / Heidi
 Martin Andreas as Jöggi
 Anne-Marie Blanc as Elisabeth Lauber
 René Deltgen as Eduard Fabricius
 Albert Lieven as Dr. Andermatt
 Heinrich Gretler as Uncle Abegg
 Leonard Steckel as Dr. Falconi
 Bobby Todd
 Renate Feuereisen as Rösli - Hausmädchen
 Erna Sellmer as Anna, Köchin
 Karl Supper as Dr. Rudd
 Anneliese Betschart as Bach-Bäuerin
 Anne-Marie Hanschke as Fräulein Reuter
 Willy Frey as Pfarrer
 Heinz-Leo Fischer
 Alfred Rasser
 Elisabeth Lauber

References

Bibliography 
 Bock, Hans-Michael & Bergfelder, Tim. The Concise CineGraph. Encyclopedia of German Cinema. Berghahn Books, 2009.

External links 
 

1954 films
Italian drama films
West German films
German drama films
1954 drama films
1950s German-language films
Swiss German-language films
Films directed by Hans Albin
German black-and-white films
Italian black-and-white films
1950s German films
1950s Italian films